The Rattlesnake Fire was a wildfire started by an arsonist on July 9, 1953, in Grindstone Canyon on the Mendocino National Forest in northern California. The wildfire killed one Forest Service employee and 14 volunteer firefighters from the New Tribes Mission, and burned over  before it was controlled on July 11, 1953. It became and remains to this day a well-known firefighting textbook case on fatal wildland fires.

Events

The arsonist, Stanford Pattan, started two fires, one on private land and the other along Alder Springs Road inside the national forest boundary. He was later convicted and sentenced on two counts of arson.

The first fire was quickly suppressed by responding firefighters. The second fire continued burning uphill in what is known as Rattlesnake Canyon; it was reported mid-afternoon and numerous fire crews responded -- from the Forest Service and the state, along with a pick-up crew hired from the New Tribes Mission at Fouts Springs. By late evening the fire was nearing containment. At about 9 p.m., however, as detailed in John N. Maclean's 2018 book River of Fire, the wind picked up, reversed direction, and poured downhill.

Casualties
Fifteen firefighters were burned to death as they tried to outrun the fire through the dense chaparral.

Aftermath
As a consequence of the fire, there were major changes to wildland fire training, firefighting safety standards, and overall awareness of how weather affects fire behavior.
The 1953 Rattlesnake Fire was one of the incidents that culminated in the 1957 Report to the Chief (the Report of the Task Force to Recommend Action to Reduce the Chances of Men Being Killed by Burning While Fighting Fire).

Footnotes

References

External links

 Time Magazine article (Monday, Jul. 20, 1953 issue) (Paywall)
 Rattlesnake Fire Memorial & Interpretive Site (with photos)
 JohnMacleanBooks.com (author website)
 River of Fire: The Rattlesnake Fire and the Mission Boys (2018 book by John Maclean)

Wildfires in Glenn County, California
1953 fires in the United States
1953 in California
1950s wildfires
Mendocino National Forest
1953 crimes in the United States
1953 natural disasters in the United States
Mass murder in 1953
California wildfires caused by arson